Tarija or San Bernardo de la Frontera de Tarixa is a city in southern Bolivia. Founded in 1574, Tarija is the largest city and capital and municipality within the Tarija Department, with an airport (Capitán Oriel Lea Plaza Airport, (TJA)) offering regular service to primary Bolivian cities, as well as a regional bus terminal with domestic and international connections. Its climate is semi-arid (BSh) with generally mild temperatures in contrast to the harsh cold of the Altiplano (e.g., La Paz) and the year-round humid heat of the Amazon Basin (e.g., Santa Cruz de la Sierra). Tarija has a population of 234,442.

History 
The name of Tarija is said to come from Francisco de Tarija or Tarifa.  However, researched information disproves that probability. Members of the first group of Spaniards to enter the valley where present-day Tarija is situated, stated that the name of Tarija was already in use. This group did not include anyone by the name of Francisco de Tarija. Similar-sounding toponyms exist for surrounding places, such as Tariquia and Taxara. In 1826 the citizens of Tarija voted to become part of Bolivia. In 1807, Tarija had become separated from Upper Peru to become part of the jurisdiction of Salta (part of Argentina), but because of its close ties to what became Bolivia, it returned to its original jurisdiction. In 1899, Argentina renounced its claims in exchange for the Puna de Atacama.

The valley that Tarija is situated in was first occupied by Western Hemispheric indigenous groups, such as the Churumatas. Subsequently, the Inca Empire – administered by the Quechua civilization – conquered the land and dispersed the Churumatas and other local groups over wide territories of the Andes. Mitimaes is the Quechuan name that the Incas used for the resisting ethnic groups they uprooted and then dispersed geographically. The Tomatas are thought to have been brought to San Juan del Oro River in the vicinities of Tarija from Norte Chico, Chile. The Tomatas appear to have given placenames from their old lands to their new area of settlement thus explaining the existence of "Chilean" placenames such as Loa, Calama, and Erqui (Elqui) in Bolivia. In 1574 conquistador Luis de Fuentes resettled the Tomatas next to the city Tarija.

When the Spanish first arrived to the valley of Tarija they encountered several stone roads, most likely the remnants of pre-Incaic cultures, such as that of the Churumatas. However, during that period, the presence of indigenous peoples remained sparse within the valley. Several of the pre-Incaic roads and trails have been preserved, and currently function as a walking trail for Tarijeños.

Facilities and tourism 
Tarija's main plaza is surrounded by restaurants of various cuisines, local handicraft shops, and internet cafes.  Within immediate walking distance is the public market, a university campus, and a number of tourist sights including the Paleontology Museum of Tarija City. The city includes higher-end restaurants as well as fast food restaurants like McRonalds, Kukis, and Homeros. Tarija's nightlife, including dance clubs, is popular with tourists.

From Tarija, primary destinations and land routes coincide with the cardinal directions: Paraguay/the Gran Chaco, to the east via Yacuiba; Argentina, to the south via Bermejo, Yacuiba or Villazón; Tupiza/the Salar de Uyuni, to the west via Villazón; and the central cities of Bolivia, to the north via Potosí.  The route to the altiplano and Potosí is much safer, as of December 2012. A new tunnel bypasses Sama, the mountain just west of the city of Tarija.

The San Jacinto Dam is located a few kilometers south of Tarija, and the Chorros de Jurina falls is located a few kilometers northwest from the city.

Tarija's land and climate are adequate for grape and wine production. The Festival of Wine is held annually in Tarija.

Climate 
Tarija has a semi-arid climate (Köppen BSh/BSk), bordering on a subtropical highland climate (Cwb). The summers are warm and generally humid, while "winters” are dry, with barely any rainfall, and temperatures warm during the day and cooler at night. Almost all the annual precipitation is received during the southern-hemisphere summer months. Frosts occasionally occur from May to October. On July 25, 2019, the most intense snowfall in Tarija since 1954 was recorded.

Gallery

Lifestyle 
Tarija is commonly regarded by Bolivian nationals and tourists alike as the "Bolivian Andalusia".  The Guadalquivir River that borders the city was named after the Spanish river of the same name.  Residents of Tarija call themselves Chapacos, regardless of social class and ethnic background.  Although the origin of the name is uncertain, there is a hypothesis that it is a variation of chacapa, the name of an indigenous settlement in the region during early colonial times.

During Bolivia's post-revolutionary period, the Chapacos voted in favor of being annexed by Bolivia instead of Argentina. For that reason, Tarijeños have been included among Bolivia's most loyal and patriotic people.  However, the modern culture is slightly isolated from the rest of urban Bolivia, and in recent times, many Tarijeñans feel much more connected to Tarija itself than to the rest of Bolivia. Their local creed is reflected in a famous, folkloric Cueca song, titled "Chapaco Soy".

Sports 
The city's Guadalquivir Coliseum has hosted games of Bolivia's national basketball team.

Twin towns – sister cities
 Mejillones, Chile
 Brasschaat, Belgium
 Tournai, Belgium
 Iniesta, Spain
 Salta, Argentina
 Villa Carlos Paz, Argentina
 Mendoza, Argentina
 Asunción, Paraguay
 San Bernardino, Paraguay

References

External links

 Tarija City Guide
 Tarija profile

 
Populated places in Tarija Department
Populated places established in 1574